Pyramid (also known as Tuckerville) is an unincorporated community in Ashley Township, Washington County, Illinois, United States. The community is located at the junction of U.S. Route 51 and Illinois Route 15. It was once the site of the Egyptian Bus Company, which was later bought by Greyhound.

Notes

Unincorporated communities in Washington County, Illinois
Unincorporated communities in Illinois